The Lugano Città–Stazione funicular, Funicolare Lugano Città–Stazione, or Sassellina, is a funicular railway in the city of Lugano in the Swiss canton of Ticino. The line's upper station is located within the main railway station of Lugano, and the lower station is on Piazza Cioccaro in the historic city centre below. It is one of the busiest funicular lines in Switzerland, carrying 2.4 million passengers in 2007.

The Lugano Città–Stazione funicular is one of three funiculars within the Lugano area. The other two are the Monte Brè funicular, which ascends Monte Brè, and the Monte San Salvatore funicular, which ascends Monte San Salvatore.

History 
The line was built in 1886, and was originally water powered. In its first year of operation, the funicular carried 118,884 passengers, taking 3 minutes for the total journey and carrying 40 passengers in each car.

The line was completely renovated and electrified in 1955, and overhauled in 1988. By 2014, the funicular was carrying approximately 2.5 million passengers per year and was considered overloaded.

A further major renovation took place between 2014 and 2016, intended to increase the capacity of the line by 20%. In order to facilitate this renovation, the line closed in July 2014, and was reopened on 11 December 2016. Two new cars, accommodating 100 passengers each, were built by Garaventa and CWA Constructions Olten. The reconstruction also involved a redesign of the interface between the funicular and railway station, with the funicular terminating in a new lower level foyer at pedestrian subway level.

During the opening ceremony, the funicular was named the Sassellina. The name, decided by a contest sponsored by TPL, recalls an old district of Lugano that has now disappeared but was next to the funicular.

Route 
The line departs from its own platforms, situated in a new station atrium and below the station forecourt, at approximately right-angles to the main line platforms of Lugano railway station. The atrium is level with, and connected to, the pedestrian subway that links to all the main line platforms.

On leaving the station the line passes through a tunnel, before emerging into the open air to cross the Via degli Amadio on a bridge. It then enters a passing loop, which is situated alongside the Cathedral of Saint Lawrence. The intermediate request stop Cattedrale is situated at the loop. Below the passing loop, the line again descends into a tunnel, before emerging into the courtyard of the Acquarello Hotel and terminating on Piazza Cioccaro in the city centre.

Operation 
The line is operated by the Trasporti Pubblici Luganesi (TPL), who also operate the city's bus network. The line runs continuously from 05:00 to midnight, seven days a week.

The funicular has the following parameters:

Both terminal stations have platforms on both sides, one used by boarding passengers and the other by alighting passengers. The intermediate request stop at Cattedrale is unusual, as its single short platform is situated alongside the northern track of the passing loop, and can thus only be served by alternate services in each direction. A stop is requested by buttons at the stop and in car 2, the car which always uses the northern side of the loop, and only a single door is opened at this stop. All platforms are equipped with platform doors, which open in synchronisation with the car doors.

See also 
 List of funicular railways
 List of funiculars in Switzerland

References

External links 

Page on the funicular from the TPL's web site (in Italian)
Article on the funicular from the Funimag online magazine
Video of the funicular in 1991 from YouTube

Funicular railways in Switzerland
Transport in Lugano
Railway lines opened in 1886
Former water-powered funicular railways converted to electricity
Metre gauge railways in Switzerland